Peter Stammbach (born November 27, 1937) is a retired Swiss professional ice hockey player who represented the Swiss national team at the 1964 Winter Olympics.

References

External links
Peter Stammbach's stats at Sports-Reference.com

1937 births
Living people
Ice hockey players at the 1964 Winter Olympics
Olympic ice hockey players of Switzerland
Ice hockey people from Bern
Swiss ice hockey centres
SC Bern players